"Supreme" is a song by English singer Robbie Williams for his third studio album, Sing When You're Winning (2000). Chrysalis Records released the song as the third single from the album on 11 December 2000. Commercially, the single reached number four on the UK Singles Chart, topped the charts of Hungary and Poland, and peaked within the top 10 in six additional European countries and New Zealand.

Composition
The bridge of the song contains an interpolation of Gloria Gaynor's "I Will Survive". The string instrument part is a François de Roubaix-composed piece from the José Giovanni-directed film Dernier domicile connu starring Lino Ventura and Marlène Jobert. The song was re-recorded in a swing tone and titled "Swing Supreme" for his 2013 album Swings Both Ways.

Chart performance
The song became another success for Robbie Williams, reaching the top 10 in the United Kingdom, Switzerland, Austria, New Zealand, and several other countries. Williams also recorded a French version of the song that was released in France, peaking at number 12 and spending 34 weeks on the French chart, being certified Gold by the Syndicat National de l'Édition Phonographique (SNEP).

Music video
The "Supreme" video, titled "Gentlemen racers" as seen in its opening credits, is a tribute to British Formula One driver Jackie Stewart. It was filmed on November 11, 2000. Williams portrays the fictitious character Bob Williams, a rival driver competing for the 1970s F1 World Championship. Williams eventually crashes his car, makes a surprise recovery, and ultimately loses the title when he gets diarrhoea before a race and is unable to line up on the starting grid due to getting locked into his caravan when the manager thought there was no one in the caravan. An epilogue reveals that Bob Williams went on to become a celebrated blues guitarist while Jackie Stewart won the championship.

The video includes stock footage of Stewart with Williams digitally inserted in many scenes, creating the near-perfect illusion of a neck-and-neck pursuit of the championship title. The video makes extensive use of the split-screen technique as it is often seen in movies from the 1960s and 70s (for instance in the 1970 feature racing movie Le Mans), and the scenes with Robbie Williams were given a yellowed, grainy image texture in the digital editing process to match the faded look of the original 35mm celluloid footage with Jackie Stewart. As yet another movie cliché, fake newspaper headlines are shown intermittently to help narrate the story.

Track listings

UK CD1 and cassette single
 "Supreme" – 4:15
 "Don't Do Love" – 4:56
 "Come Take Me Over" – 4:13

UK CD2
 "Supreme" – 4:15
 "United" – 5:56
 "Supreme" (recorded live at the Manchester Arena) – 4:18
 "Supreme" (filmed live at the Manchester Arena) – 4:08

Australasian CD single
 "Supreme" – 4:15
 "United" – 5:56
 "Supreme" (live from Manchester) – 4:18
 "Don't Do Love" – 4:57
 "Come Take Me Over" – 4:11

Credits and personnel
Credits are taken from the Sing When You're Winning album booklet.

Studios
 Recorded at Master Rock Studios (North London, England) and Sarm Hook End (Reading, England)
 Mixed at Battery Studios (London, England)
 Mastered at Metropolis Mastering (London, England)

Personnel

 Robbie Williams – writing, lead vocals
 Guy Chambers – writing, all keyboards, production, arrangement
 Freddie Perren – writing
 Dino Fekaris – writing
 Claire Worrall – backing vocals
 Crystal Adams – backing vocals
 Marielle Hervé – backing vocals
 Neil Taylor – acoustic and electric guitars
 Phil Spalding – bass guitar
 Chris Sharrock – ambient drum kit
 Andy Duncan – drum programming
 Richard Flack – drum programming, Pro Tools
 Tony Pleeth – string loop
 Paul Kegg – string loop
 Richard Boothby – string loop
 Richard Campbell – string loop
 London Session Orchestra – orchestra
 Gavyn Wright – concertmaster
 Nick Ingman – orchestration
 Isobel Griffiths – orchestral contractor
 Steve Price – orchestral engineering
 Steve Power – production, mixing
 Tony Cousins – mastering

Charts and certifications

Weekly charts

Year-end charts

Certifications

Samples and cover versions
The McFly song "I Need a Woman" from 2010's Above the Noise album samples the riff from "Supreme". Max Raabe and the Palast Orchester made a cover in their 2001 album Superhits. In 2022 k-pop girls band IVE used "Supreme" speed up version as a sample, for their song "After LIKE".

In popular culture
The song is the title theme for the Polish TV drama series Londyńczycy (Polish for The Londoners) aired on TVP 1 since late 2008.

References

2000 singles
2000 songs
Chrysalis Records singles
Music videos directed by Vaughan Arnell
Number-one singles in Hungary
Number-one singles in Poland
Robbie Williams songs
Song recordings produced by Guy Chambers
Song recordings produced by Steve Power
Songs written by Dino Fekaris
Songs written by Freddie Perren
Songs written by Guy Chambers
Songs written by Robbie Williams